Lapalud is a commune in the Vaucluse department in the Provence-Alpes-Côte d'Azur region in southeastern France.

People from Lapalud 
 Rodolphe Julian (1839–1907), founder of the Académie Julian
 Alain Borne (1915–1962), poet winner of the 1954 Prix Antonin-Artaud, died in road incident in Lapalud.

See also
Communes of the Vaucluse department
Tricastin Nuclear Power Plant

References

Communes of Vaucluse